The 2021 Football Tasmania season is the eighth season of soccer under the restructured format in Tasmania. The men's competitions consisted of three major divisions across the State.

Men's Competitions

2021 NPL Tasmania

The NPL Premier normally qualifies for the national NPL finals series, but the 2021 National Premier Leagues finals series was cancelled.

2021 Tasmanian Championships

2021 Northern Championship

2021 Southern Championship

Women's Competitions

2021 Women's Super League

The 2021 Women's Super League season is the sixth edition of the statewide Tasmanian women's soccer league. The league expanded to seven teams this season, with the addition of three new teams (Devonport, Launceston United and Taroona), while University of Tasmania SC elected not to return and Ulverstone SC were not offered a licence.

Cup competitions

References

2021 in Australian soccer
Football Federation Tasmania seasons